Hash browns, also spelled hashed browns and hashbrowns, are a popular American breakfast dish consisting of finely julienned potatoes that have been fried until browned. Hash browns are a staple breakfast food at diners in North America, where they are often fried on a large common cooktop or grill.

Hash browns are a popular mass-produced product sold in refrigerated, frozen and dehydrated forms.

History 
Hash browns first started appearing on breakfast menus in New York City in the 1890s.

Originally, the full name of the dish was "hashed brown potatoes" (or "hashed browned potatoes"), of which the first known mention is by American food author Maria Parloa (1843–1909) in her 1887 Kitchen Companion, where she describes the dish of "hashed and browned potatoes" as a fried mixture of cold boiled potatoes which is folded "like an omelet" before serving.

The name was gradually shortened to "hash brown potatoes".

Etymology 
The word hash is derived from the French word "hacher", which means to hack or chop. This means hashed browned potatoes literally translates to "chopped and fried potatoes".

Preparation 

A chef may prepare hash browns by either grating potato or forming riced potatoes into patties before frying with onions (moisture and potato starch can hold them together); however, if a binding agent is added (egg or flour for example), such a preparation constitutes a potato pancake. 

Hash browns are sometimes made into patty form and frozen for ease of handling, and the compact, flat shape can also be cooked in a toaster oven or toaster. For best results, in both cooking and flavor, it is recommended that hash browns be made using starchy potatoes such as russet potatoes. If a dish of hash browned potatoes incorporates chopped meat, leftovers, or other vegetables, it is more commonly referred to as hash.

Hash browns are also manufactured as a dehydrated food, which is sometimes used by backpackers.

In some parts of the United States, hash browns strictly refer to shredded or riced pan-fried potatoes, while diced and pan-fried potatoes are called country fried potatoes or home fries and are served as a side dish at other meals. Some recipes add diced or chopped onions.

See also 
 Potato pancake
 Boxty
 Bubble and squeak
 Croquette
 Fried potatoes
 Potato waffle
 Rösti
 Tater tots
 Funeral potatoes

References

External links 

 United States Standards for Grades of Frozen Hash Brown Potatoes (PDF)

Deep fried foods
Potato dishes
Potato pancakes